Bert Reeves (born December 9, 1976) is an American politician who has served in the Georgia House of Representatives from the 34th district since 2015. He resigned from office at the end of April 2021 to become Georgia Tech's Vice President for Institute Relations, with Devan Seabaugh winning the special election to replace him.

References

1976 births
Living people
Republican Party members of the Georgia House of Representatives
21st-century American politicians